General Jean Victor Allard  (12 June 1913 – 23 April 1996) was the first French Canadian to become Chief of the Defence Staff, the highest position in the Canadian Forces, from 1966 to 1969. He was also the first to hold the accompanying rank of general.

Military career 
Allard served as an officer in the Régiment de Trois-Rivières prior to World War II. After the outbreak of war in 1939, he was attested to the Canadian Active Service Force and promoted to the rank of major. When the active component of his regiment was redesignated to become an Anglophone armoured unit, he requested a transfer to the infantry and became the Deputy Commanding Officer of Régiment de la Chaudière in England. In December 1943, he became the Commanding Officer of the Royal 22e Régiment in Italy.

He was in command of the 6th Canadian Infantry Brigade at the end of the war in Germany, in the rank of brigadier (now brigadier-general). He was awarded the Distinguished Service Order (DSO) on three occasions. He was the Canadian Military Attaché in Moscow after the war until 1948 when he was appointed Commander for the East Quebec Area. During the Korean War, he commanded the 25th Canadian Infantry Brigade from April 1953. He signed the truce at Panmunjon on Canada's behalf on 27 July 1953. He became commander of the 3rd Canadian Infantry Brigade in 1954 and Commander of the Eastern Quebec Area in 1956. In 1958 he was made Vice-Chief of the General Staff.

As a major-general, he commanded the British 4th Division from 1961 to 1963, as part of the British Army of the Rhine (BAOR). In 1964 he was made Chief of Operational Readiness. As a lieutenant-general, he was Commander, Mobile Command from 1965 to 1966, comprising the Canadian land forces in Canada and, at that time, the close air support forces, as well.

In July 1966, Allard was promoted to full general. From 1966 to 1969, he was Chief of the Defence Staff.

In 1985, he published his memoirs, with English translation in 1988 The memoirs of General Jean V. Allard, written in cooperation with Serge Bernier.

Honours 

The Général-Jean-Victor-Allard Building, the home of the Canadian Forces Leadership and Recruit School, was named in honour of General Allard.

References

External links 
Jean Victor Allard Fonds
Generals of World War II
Canada's 25 Most Renowned Military Leaders

|-

|-

|-

|-

|-

1913 births
1996 deaths
Chiefs of the Defence Staff (Canada)
Canadian generals
Canadian military personnel of the Korean War
Canadian Army personnel of World War II
Canadian Commanders of the Order of the British Empire
Companions of the Distinguished Service Order
Companions of the Order of Canada
Grand Officers of the National Order of Quebec
Recipients of the Bronze Lion
Chevaliers of the Légion d'honneur
Recipients of the Croix de Guerre (France)
Foreign recipients of the Legion of Merit
People from Centre-du-Québec
Canadian Militia officers
Commanders of the Canadian Army
Military attachés
Royal 22nd Regiment officers
Canadian military personnel from Quebec